Ada Meyo Marie Noelle (born 6 April 1990) is a Gabonese beauty pageant titleholder who was crowned Miss Gabon 2012.

Miss Gabon 2012
Marie Noelle Ada is from the province of Ngounie. She was crowned Miss Gabon 2012 by Miss Universe 2011 Leila Lopes during a festive gala on December 29, 2011 at the "City of Democracy" in Libreville. She won cash, a house and a Hyundai ix35. She entered the Miss World 2012 competition in China.

Miss World
On August 18, 2012 she represented Gabon at Miss World held in the Ordos Stadium Arena in Ordos City, China.

Ada said that her goals included the construction of a nursing home during her reign as Miss Gabon.

References

External links

1990 births
Living people
Gabonese beauty pageant winners
People from Ngounié Province
Miss World 2012 delegates